Alternative for Italy (APLI) is a right-wing populist political alliance in Italy launched on 10 July 2022 by Mario Adinolfi, leader of The People of Family (PdF), and Simone Di Stefano, leader of Exit.

History
On 10 July 2022, Mario Adinolfi, leader of the Christian-rightist party The People of Family (PdF), and Simone Di Stefano, leader of the nationalist movement Exit and former secretary of the neo-fascist CasaPound, announced the formation of a joint list to run in the upcoming general election. The party deliberately took inspiration from the nationalist party Alternative for Germany (AfD).

Alternative for Italy harshly condemned the policies promoted by the government of Mario Draghi, especially regarding the mandatory vaccination against COVID-19 and the COVID-19 vaccination certificate (Green Pass). APLI is also against the European Union and in favor of a reconciliation with Vladimir Putin's Russia following the invasion of Ukraine.

Composition

Electoral results

Italian Parliament

References

2022 establishments in Italy
Political parties established in 2022
Right-wing politics in Italy
Political party alliances in Italy
Alternative for Germany spinoff